Ostrów  is a village in the administrative district of Gmina Janów Podlaski, within Biała Podlaska County, Lublin Voivodeship, in eastern Poland, close to the border with Belarus.

The village has a population of 200.

References

Villages in Biała Podlaska County